"Cool It Now" is a 1984 hit single by American group New Edition, and is the first single from their eponymous second album, New Edition. In the US, the song entered the Hot Black Singles chart on September 1, 1984. The song peaked at number 4 in January 1985 on the Billboard Hot 100 chart. Lyrically, the song depicts a guy professing his love for a girl, despite growing concerns from his friends.

Overview
With the group now signed to MCA Records, "Cool It Now" (and the album from which it came) was given more extensive and widespread promotion than any single from their previous album (which had been released through a smaller, independent label), and helped bring the group a bigger fan base.  The song was the group's first top 10 pop single, peaking at number four on the pop chart, and their second number one R&B hit.

The song is notable for a midsection rap recited by lead singer Ralph Tresvant, which calls out the rest of the group: "Ronnie, Bobby, Ricky, and Mike." In later years, the rap has been changed to include "Johnny" for the last member to join, Johnny Gill, either including his name as a fifth name called out or replacing "Bobby".

Ralph Tresvant provided lead vocals, singing about wanting to let himself fall in love despite his friends telling him to "cool it now."
There are two rap interludes in this song. The first finds Michael Bivins and Ronnie DeVoe trading lines, telling Ralph Tresvant to take it slow. Later in the song, Tresvant raps his retort, letting them know he appreciates their input but will ignore it at his own risk.

Robbers on High Street recorded a cover of the song for Engine Room Recordings' compilation album Guilt by Association Vol. 2, which was released in November 2008.

Personnel
Engineer – John Wood, Taavi Mote, Vincent Brantley
Producer, Bass, Guitar, LinnDrum – Rick Timas
Producer, Keyboards – Vincent Brantley
Remix – Louil Silas, Jr.
Ronnie DeVoe – background vocals, rap
Bobby Brown – background vocals
Ricky Bell – background vocals
Michael Bivins – background vocals, rap
Ralph Tresvant – lead and background vocals, rap

Charts

Weekly charts

Year-end charts

Certifications

References

1984 singles
New Edition songs
Post-disco songs
1984 songs
MCA Records singles